C. Haley Bunn (born 1985/1986) is an American attorney who was appointed to serve as a justice of the Supreme Court of Appeals of West Virginia.

Early life and education 

A native of Oceana, West Virginia, Bunn was born into a coal mining family. She earned a bachelor's degree from West Virginia University and a Juris Doctor from the West Virginia University College of Law.

Career 

Bunn began her career as an attorney for Steptoe & Johnson. She later served as an assistant United States attorney for the Southern District of West Virginia. A specialist in prosecuting opioid-related cases, Bunn was selected to serve on the United States Department of Justice's Opioid Fraud and Abuse Detection Unit in 2017.

Supreme Court of Appeals of West Virginia 
On April 6, 2022, Bunn was appointed by Governor Jim Justice to succeed Evan Jenkins as a justice of the Supreme Court of Appeals of West Virginia. and took office on April 27, 2022. She was sworn into office on May 12, 2022, making her the youngest woman to serve on the court.

Personal life 

Bunn lives with her husband and two children in Charleston, West Virginia. They attend Bible Center Church, and Bunn serves on the board of the Bible Center School. She is also a member of the Defense Trial Counsel of West Virginia and has volunteered with the Boy Scouts of America.

References 

Year of birth missing (living people)
1980s births
Living people
21st-century American judges
21st-century American women lawyers
21st-century American lawyers
American prosecutors
Assistant United States Attorneys
Justices of the Supreme Court of Appeals of West Virginia
People from Wyoming County, West Virginia
West Virginia lawyers
West Virginia University alumni
West Virginia University College of Law alumni
21st-century American women judges